The Doopsgezinde kerk is a historical hidden Mennonite church dating from the 17th century between the Grote Houtstraat, Peuzelaarsteeg and the Frankestraat in Haarlem, Netherlands.

History

The church (also referred to as the Vermaning) was built in 1683. The original entrance was a simple narrow door in the alley connecting the shopping street Grote Houtstraat to the Frankestraat, called the Peuzelaarsteeg, and through the purchase of a house in the Frankestraat a new, larger, entrance was created in 1717. In 1757 a group of members of the church, including Pieter Teyler van der Hulst, purchased a house on the Grote Houtstraat and created a modern but unobtrusive entrance with long hallway. In 1902 the Frankestraat entrance was renovated and new regents’ rooms were created in Jugendstil. During the course of centuries, almost the entire block of houses was purchased by the church, and a large house across from the church in the Frankestraat, the "Huis ter Kleef", was used as an orphanage. The house on the corner of the Peuzelaarsteeg and the Grote Houtstraat (nr. 51) also was purchased by Pieter Teyler, and he rented it to the Dutch Society of Science for their museum, which was the first museum in Haarlem that opened its doors in 1777.

List of teachers

The church calls its ministers teachers, and the names are written on a large name board in one of the meeting rooms, along with a list of deacons. In 1804 a songbook Christelijke Gezangen en Liederen was published in Haarlem of 150 songs with accompanying music. It had a title vignette by Reinier Vinkeles and a forward which was signed by the teachers Klaas van der Horst, Petrus Loosjes Az., Barend Hartman van Groningen, Matthias van Geuns Jz], Martinus Bodisco and Adriaan Loosjes Pz. Aagje Deken wrote the text for 74 of these songs for which she asked 4 ducats (21 guilders) compensation per page.

References

Churches in Haarlem
History of Haarlem
Rijksmonuments in Haarlem
Religious buildings and structures completed in 1613
Protestant churches in the Netherlands
1613 establishments in the Dutch Republic